Velaiya Swamigal, also called Velaiyar, born during the seventeenth century, was a Saivaite spiritual writer. He was born to a Tamil-speaking Desikar family in Kanchipuram, Tamil Nadu. He compiled more than seven books.

Family Background
Velaiyar was born in Kanchipuram (Kanchipuram) in the Thondai mandalam region of Tamil Nadu, South India into an orthodox Saiva Tamil (Desikar) family around the middle of the 17th century. Veliyar's father, Kumara swamy Desikar, was an Archaka and Dikshithar and his family were known for their literary, theological and musical contributions in Tamil. At a young age, his father had left his family and went to Thiruvannamalai with his disciples where he planned to become a sage. However, once there he got married and had three sons and a daughter. Velaiyar was the third child and his siblings were Siva prakasar, Karunai prakasar, and Gnambikai ammal. Siva prakasar was a well-known poet who was blessed as ‘Sivanuputhichelvar’. He is acclaimed as ‘Karpanai Kalangiyam’ by renowned scholars of Tamil –speaking world. He compiled " Neerotta Yamaha Anthathi " to defeat an  arrogant rival poet. The verses were written such that will when recited, the lips of the speaker never have to touch. He also wrote " Yesu Matha Niragaranam " (The Refuting the Religion of Jesus). He died aged 32 in Nallathur, near Pondicherry.

His sister Gnambikai married Perur Santhalinga Swamigal. She had no children. Her husband became a sage and sent Gnamibikai ammal back to her brother's residence. She stayed along with Velaiyar and spent her lifetime in Pommapuram mutt worshipping God.

Karunai prakasar married and wrote more than five books in Tamil. Seegalathi sarukkam, Ishtalinga Agaval. He died at Thiruvengai without any children.

Velaiyar married Meenatchi Ammal and settled down at Mailam near by Pommapura Aadeenam mutt.  He had a son named Sundaresanar.
He died at Perumathur at the age of 72.

Velaiyar's son Sundresanar married Karpagammal. He settled down his family in Valavanur near by Mailam. They in turn had a son named Swaminatha Desikar.

Swaminatha Desikar converted himself to Christianity, changed his name to Susai Alias Swaminatha Desikar and married Gnasounthari.

Early life
Along with his older brother Sivaprakasa swamigal, travelled widely all over Tamil Nadu, famous temples like Thiruvannamalai, Thiruchendur, Mailam.

On one of his journeys around Tamil Nadu Sivaprakasa Swamigal, Velaiyar and Karunai prakasar went to Tirunelveli to meet and be taught
by a pandit  Valliyur Thambiran, who was an expert on grammar. This teacher accepted them as his student. Velaiyar learnt Tamil grammar along with his brothers.

Books

 Mayilathula
 Nallur puranam
 Mayilai thirattai mani maalai
 Ishta linga kaithala maalai
 Kumbakona Sarangathevar history as Veera singhathana puranam
 Gugai Namachivaya Desikar history as Namchivaya leelai
 Krisnanan history as Paarijatha leelai

References

Tamil-language literature
18th-century Indian philosophers
Indian Hindu spiritual teachers
People from Kanchipuram district
1768 births
1840 deaths
19th-century Indian philosophers
Scholars from Tamil Nadu